The Swedish Navy is the naval branch of the Swedish Armed Forces. It is composed of surface and submarine naval units – the Fleet – as well as marine units, the Amphibious Corps.

Founded under King Gustav I in 1522, the Swedish navy is one of the oldest continuously serving navies in the world, celebrating its 500th anniversary in 2022.

History

Early Swedish kings ( 9th–14th centuries) organised a Swedish Navy along the coastline through . This involved combined rowing and sailing ships (without artillery). This system became obsolete with the development of society and changes in military technology. In 1427, when Sweden was still part of the Kalmar Union (with Denmark and Norway), Swedish warships did however participate in the naval battle of Öresund against the Hanseatic League. It is unclear how this force was organised and exactly on what basis.

On 7 June 1522, one year after the separation of Sweden from the Kalmar Union, Gustav Vasa purchased a number of ships from the Hanseatic town of Lübeck. Official Swedish histories since the 19th century have often recorded this day as the birth of the current Swedish Navy. The museum ship  in Stockholm was a 17th-century ship of the Royal Swedish Navy.

The Amphibious Corps dates back to 1 January 1902, when a separate "Coastal Artillery" was established, and  came into use as the name of the service as a whole. The last decade of the 20th century saw the abandonment of the coastal fortifications and the force became a more regular marine corps, renamed Amphibious Corps in 2000.

For most of the twentieth century, the Swedish Navy focused on the threat of a full-scale invasion of Sweden via the Baltic Sea and on protecting commercial shipping. Sweden's location on the Scandinavian peninsula makes it highly dependent of maritime trade: 90% imports and exports enter or leave Sweden through the Baltic. In 1972, the government decreed that non-military measures should be used to protect merchant shipping. The resolution led to the de-commissioning of all the navy's destroyers and frigates, though the non-military measures the government intended to use to protect shipping have never been specified.

The navy first participated in a UN-led peacekeeping mission in October 2006 when the corvette  began performing coastal surveillance duties for the United Nations Mission in Lebanon.

In 2010,  was the EUNAVFOR flagship, housing the fleet headquarters led by RAdm (LH) Jan Thörnqvist.

Organization
Until recently, the Navy was led by the Chief of the Navy, who was typically a vice admiral. This office has been eliminated, and the highest officer of the Navy is now the Chief of Navy, Rear Admiral Ewa Skoog Haslum, who is the senior representative of the Swedish Navy's combat forces.

The Marine units use the same system of rank as the Army.

Naval units
 1st Submarine Flotilla (1. ubflj) located in Karlskrona
 3rd Naval Warfare Flotilla (3. sjöstridsflj) located in Karlskrona
 4th Naval Warfare Flotilla (4. sjöstridsflj) located at Berga

Amphibious units
 1st Marine Regiment located in Berga
 4th Marine Regimentlocated in Gothenburg

Bases
 Muskö naval base, located at Muskö island in the Stockholm archipelago. The base serves as the headquarters of the Swedish Navy since September 2019.
 Karlskrona naval base (MarinB), located at Karlskrona with detachments at Berga, Gothenburg and Skredsvik.

Training units
 Swedish Naval Warfare Centre (SSS) located in Karlskrona

Equipment

In the decades following World War II, the Swedish Navy was organised around three light cruiser groups (and ). In the early 1960s, a decision, known as Navy Plan 60, was made to scrap the cruisers and move towards a larger fleet of smaller vessels. The last cruiser, Göta Lejon, was sold in 1970 to Chile, where she was renamed Almirante Latorre. The fleet at the time comprised some 24 destroyers and frigates for surface warfare (mainly in the Baltic Sea) and anti-submarine warfare.

The Swedish Navy started to experiment with missiles, based on a recovered German V-2 rocket, as early as 1944. The main armament of the fleet was artillery and torpedoes for surface warfare and anti-submarine rockets for anti-submarine warfare. Helicopters (Alouette II and Vertol 44) were introduced in the late 1950s and 1960s and this fleet air arm remained an integral part of the fleet and its operations until an independent helicopter arm was created in the 1990s.

The 1972 decision made by the Government to decommission all destroyers and frigates within the next decade limited the Navy's endurance considerably, but the use of smaller short-range ships was at the time deemed adequate for anti-shipping missions along the coast and in the archipelago. In the 1980s, this assessment was proven wrong by repeated failures in anti-submarine warfare operations with inadequate ships and equipment. Today, the largest (surface) combat ships are corvettes which combine surface warfare, anti-submarine warfare and mine clearance functions with a better endurance and seaworthiness than the budget fleet from the 1980s.

Since the 1980s, Swedish surface warships have been named after Swedish cities, while submarines are named after Swedish provinces and minehunters after Swedish lighthouses. The surface ships are mostly small, relying on agility and flexibility. Examples of these are the Stockholm and Göteborg-class corvettes. The Navy is currently taking into service the new, larger,  of stealth corvettes. A new submarine class, similar to the older , was commissioned in 1998. Its air-independent Stirling engine enables submerged endurance never before seen in conventional submarines. Gotland has been on lease with crew and all to the US Navy and was based in San Diego.

The Amphibious Battalion is built around the Stridsbåt 90H, a small combat boat capable of carrying 21 troops for fast transports and landings in the archipelago. It is also equipped with larger transport boats, but relies on the Army, Navy and Air Force for heavy transports and protection. Cooperation with the Royal Netherlands Navy is under investigation for Amphibious Warfare.

The Swedish Armed Forces operate three types of helicopters: NHIndustries NH90 (HKP14) (18 in service), AgustaWestland AW109 (HKP15) (20 in service) and Sikorsky UH-60 Black Hawk (HKP16) (15 in service). Nine of the NHIndustries NH90 helicopters are equipped with sonars and radars for anti-submarine warfare.

Upcoming investments 
The next generation of submarines, the A26 class, was ordered from Saab Technologies in 2015 and will join the navy starting 2027. In parallel, the  will undergo a mid-life upgrade.

In 2017 a new intelligence ship to replace  was ordered from Saab Technologies. The new ship HSwMS Artemis is to be commissioned by the end of 2023 and have a displacement of 2,300 tons.

An aditonal 4 surface combatant ships are to be ordered in the near future with two new ships near 2030 while HSwMS Gävle and HSwMS Sundsvall will undergo yet another life extension program.

Submarines

Surface vessels

Corvettes

Minesweepers

Patrol boats

Combat boats

Ocean patrol vessels

Signal intelligence vessels

Auxiliary vessels, major

Auxiliary vessels, others

Landing craft
 (appr. 100 in service)
 Tugs
 Damen ASD3010 Coastal Tug
 Damen ASD3010 Coastal Tug
 Torpedo salvage vessels

 Transport ships
 HSwMS Loke (A344)
 HSwMS Nåttarö (A608)
Lätt trossbåt Fast Supply Vessels (16 vessels in service)
 Hovercraft
Griffon 2000TD Hovercraft (3 craft in service)

Training ships
 Schooners
 
 
 Ships for navigation education

Commanders

Ranks

Commissioned officer ranks
The rank insignia of commissioned officers.

Other ranks
The rank insignia of non-commissioned officers and enlisted personnel.

See also

 Royal Swedish Society of Naval Sciences
 Leidang
 List of Swedish wars
 List of Swedish military commanders
 List of ships of the Swedish Navy
 List of coastal defence ships of the Swedish Navy
 Swedish Admirals

Notes

References

External links
  
  
 Göran Frilund – The Swedish Navy 1788–1809